Niagara Falls is a city in Ontario, Canada. It is on the western bank of the Niagara River in the Golden Horseshoe region of Southern Ontario, with a population of 88,071 at the 2016 census. It is part of the St. Catharines - Niagara Census Metropolitan Area (CMA). Incorporated on 12 June 1903, the city is across the river from Niagara Falls, New York. The Niagara River flows over Niagara Falls at this location, creating a natural spectacle which attracts millions of tourists each year.

The tourist area near the falls includes observation towers, high-rise hotels, souvenir shops, museums, indoor water parks, casinos and theatres, mostly with colourful neon billboards and advertisements. Other parts of the city include golf courses, parks, historic sites from the War of 1812, and residential neighbourhoods.

History
Prior to European arrival, present day Niagara Falls was populated by Iroquoian-speaking Neutral people but, after attacks from the Haudenosaunee and Seneca, the Neutral people population was severely reduced. The Haudenosaunee people remained in the area until Europeans made first contact in the late 17th century. The Niagara Falls area had some European settlement in the 17th century. Louis Hennepin, a French priest and missionary, is considered to be the first European to visit the area in the 1670s. French colonists settled mostly in Lower Canada, beginning near the Atlantic, and in Quebec and Montreal.

After surveys were completed in 1782 the area was referred to as Township Number 2 as well as Mount Dorchester after Guy Carleton, 1st Baron Dorchester (and today is only honoured by Dorchester Road and the community of Dorchester Village). The earliest settlers of Township Number 2 were Philip George Bender (namesake of Bender Street and Bender Hill near Casino Niagara originally from Germany and later New Jersey and Philadelphia) and Thomas McMicken (a Scottish-born British Army veteran). Increased settlement in this area took place during and after the American Revolutionary War, when the British Crown made land grants to Loyalists to help them resettle in Upper Canada and provide some compensation for their losses after the United States became independent. Loyalist Robert Land received  and was one of the first people of European descent to settle in the Niagara Region. He moved to nearby Hamilton three years later due to the relentless noise of the falls.

In 1791, John Graves Simcoe renamed the town was Stamford after Stamford, Lincolnshire in England but today Stamford is only used for an area northwest of downtown Niagara Falls as well as Stamford Street. During the war of 1812, the battle of Lundy's Lane took place in July 1814. In 1856, the Town of Clifton was incorporated by Ogden Creighton after Clifton, Bristol. The name of the town was changed to Niagara Falls in 1881. In 1882, the community of Drummondville (near the present-day corner of Lundy's Lane and Main Street) was incorporated as the village of Niagara Falls (South). The village was referred to as Niagara Falls South to differentiate it from the town. In 1904, the town and village amalgamated to form the City of Niagara Falls. In 1963, the city amalgamated with the surrounding Stamford Township. In 1970, the Niagara regional government was formed. This resulted in the village of Chippawa, Willoughby Township, and part of Crowland Township being annexed into Niagara Falls.

An internment camp for Germans was set up at The Armoury (now Niagara Military Museum) in Niagara Falls from December 1914 to August 1918.

The city's official historian is Sherman Zavitz, who gives regular radio broadcasts on many aspects of Niagara's history.

Black history 

Niagara Falls has had a Black population since at least 1783. Up to 12 African-Americans were a part of the Butler's Rangers, including Richard Pierpoint. When they were disbanded in 1783, they tried to establish themselves through farming nearby, making them among the first Black settlers in the region. It is estimated that nearly 10 percent of the Loyalists to settle in the area were Black Loyalists.

Niagara Falls' Black population increased in the following decades, as a destination on the Underground Railroad. In 1856, a British Methodist Episcopal (BME) Church was established for African-Canadian worshipers. The BME Church, Nathaniel Dett Memorial Chapel is now a National Historic Site, remaining in operation into the 21st century. Composer, organist, pianist and music professor Nathaniel Dett was born in Niagara Falls in 1882.

In 1886, Burr Plato became one of the first African Canadians to be elected to political office, holding the position of City Councillor of Niagara Falls until 1901.

Geography

Topography
The city is built along the Niagara Falls waterfalls and the Niagara Gorge on the Niagara River, which flows from Lake Erie to Lake Ontario.

Climate
The city of Niagara Falls has a humid continental climate (Köppen Dfa) which is moderated to an extent in all seasons by proximity to water bodies. However, temperatures above  are common during winter.

Communities and neighbourhoods
Although more historical and cultural diversity exists, Niagara Falls has 11 communities and 67 neighbourhoods defined by Planning Neighbourhoods and Communities for the City of Niagara Falls.

Beaverdams
Hyott
N.E.C. West
Nichols
Shriners
Warner
Chippawa
Bridgewater
Cummings
Hunter
Kingsbridge
Ussher
Weinbrenner
Crowland
Crowland
Drummond
Brookfield
Caledonia
Coronation
Corwin
Drummond Industrial Basin
Hennepin
Leeming
Merrit
Miller
Orchard
Trillium
Elgin
Balmoral
Central Business District
Glenview
Hamilton
Maple
Oakes
Ryerson
Valleyway
Grassybrook
Grassybrook Industrial Basin
Oakland
Rexinger
Northwest
Carmel
Kent
Mulhearn
Queen Victoria
Clifton Hill
Fallsview North
Fallsview South
Marineland
Queen Victoria
Stamford
Burdette
Calaguiro
Church
Cullimore
Gauld
Ker
Mitchellson
Mountain
N.E.C. East
Olden
Pettit
Portage
Queensway Gardens
Rolling Acres
Thompson
Wallice
Westlane
Garner
Hodgson
Lundy
Munro
Oakwood
Royal Manor
Westlane Industrial Basin
Willoughby
Niagara River Parkway
Willoughby

Demographics

As of the 2021 Census, 20.9% of the city's population were visible minorities, 3.5% had Indigenous ancestry, and the remaining 75.6% were White. The largest visible minority groups were South Asian (6.3%), Black (3.1%), Filipino (3.0%), Chinese (2.4%), Latin American (1.6%) and Arab (1.1%).

60.1% of Niagara Falls city residents self-identified with Christian denominations in 2021, down from 74.1% in 2011. 33.2% of residents were Catholic, 13.9% were Protestant, 7.1% were Christians of unspecified denomination, and 2.4% were Christian Orthodox. All other Christian denominations/Christian related traditions made up 3.5%. 30.9% of residents were irreligious or secular, up from 22.5% in 2011. Overall, followers of non-Christian religions/spiritual traditions were 9.0% of the population. The largest of these were Islam (4.1%), Hinduism (2.0%), Sikhism (1.4%) and Buddhism (0.8%)

Economy

Tourism started in the early 19th century and has been a vital part of the local economy since that time. The falls became known as a natural wonder, in part to their being featured in paintings by prominent American artists of the 19th century such as Albert Bierstadt. Such works were reproduced as lithographs, becoming widely distributed. Niagara Falls marketed itself as a honeymoon destination, describing itself as the "honeymoon capital of the world". Its counterpart in New York also used the moniker. The phrase was most commonly used in brochures in the early twentieth century and declined in usage around the 1960s.

With a plentiful and inexpensive source of hydroelectric power from the waterfalls, many electro-chemical and electro-metallurgical industries located there in the early to mid-20th century. Industry began moving out of the city in the 1970s and 80s because of economic recession and increasing global competition in the manufacturing sector. Tourism increasingly became the city's most important revenue source.

In 2004, several tourist establishments in Niagara Falls began adding a three percent marketing fee to bills. The collected money is untraceable, and there are no controls over how each establishment spends it. The Ontario government—concerned tourists could be misled into believing the fees were endorsed by the government—warned hotels and restaurants in 2008 not to claim the fee if it was not being remitted to a legitimate non-profit agency that promotes tourism. The practise continues, and takes in an estimated $15 million per-year from tourists unaware the fee is voluntary and can be removed from their bill.

Recent development has been mostly centred on the Clifton Hill and Fallsview areas. The Niagara Falls downtown (Queen Street) is undergoing a major revitalization; the city is encouraging redevelopment of this area as an arts and culture district. The downtown was a major centre for local commerce and night life up until the 1970s, when the Niagara Square Shopping Centre began to draw away crowds and retailers. Since 2006, Historic Niagara has brought art galleries, boutiques, cafés and bistros to the street. Attractions include renovation of the Seneca Theatre.

Comparison to Niagara Falls, New York 
In the 20th century, there was a favourable exchange rate when comparing Canadian and U.S. currencies. 

Niagara Falls, New York, struggles to compete against Niagara Falls, Ontario; the Canadian side has a greater average annual income, a higher average home price, and lower levels of vacant buildings and blight, as well as a more vibrant economy and better tourism infrastructure. The population of Niagara Falls, New York fell by half from the 1960s to 2012. In contrast, the population of Niagara Falls, Ontario more than tripled.

The Ontario government introduced legal gambling to the local economy in the mid-1990s. Casino Niagara precipitated an economic boom in the late 1990s as numerous luxury hotels and tourist attractions were built, and a second casino, Niagara Fallsview, opened in 2004. Both attracted American tourists due in part to the comparatively less expensive Canadian dollar, and despite the opening of the Seneca Niagara Casino on the American side. When the Canadian and US currencies moved closer to parity in the 2000s, Niagara Falls, Ontario continued to be a popular destination for Americans, while Niagara Falls, New York, experienced a prolonged economic downturn. Ontario's legal drinking age is 19, which attracts potential alcohol consumers from across the border, as the American drinking age is 21.

Arts and culture

Some cultural areas of Niagara Falls include Queen Street, Main and Ferry Streets, Stamford Centre and Chippawa Square. Community centres that are host to cultural activities include the City of Niagara Falls Museums, Niagara Falls Public Libraries, Coronation 50 Plus Recreation Centre, Club Italia and Scotia Bank Convention Centre.

Visual arts
 Niagara Falls Art Gallery
 Peterson's Community Gallery

Performing arts
 Niagara Falls Centre for the Arts
 Seneca Queen Theatre

History

 Niagara Falls History Museum
 Battle Ground Hotel Museum
 Willoughby Historical Museum
 Niagara Military Museum
 Niagara Falls Wedding and Fashion Museum
 Lundy's Lane Historical Society
 Battle of Lundy's Lane Walking Tour
 Historic Drummondville
 Stamford Historic Area

Nature, parks and gardens
 Queen Victoria Park
 Rosberg Family Park / Olympic Torch Trail

Festivals and events
 Winter Festival of Lights
 Niagara Integrated Film Festival
 Springlicious
 Mount Carmel Fine Art and Music Festival
 Niagara Icewine Festival
 Niagara Woodworking Show
 Greater Niagara Home and Garden Show
 Niagara Night of Art
 Niagara Region Jazz Festival

Conventions and conferences
 Niagara Falls Convention Centre
 Sheraton on the Falls Hotel and Conference Centre

Sports teams and leagues

Attractions 
 
Notable attractions in Niagara Falls include:
 Table Rock Welcome Centre
 Journey Behind the Falls
 Skylon Tower 
 Niagara SkyWheel
 Winter Festival of Lights
 Niagara Parks Butterfly Conservatory
 Niagara Heritage Trail
 Dufferin Islands
 Niagara Parks School of Horticulture
 The Rainbow Carillon, which sounds from the Rainbow Tower
 Clifton Hill, Niagara Falls — Tourist promenade featuring a Ripley's Believe It Or Not Museum, arcades, five haunted houses, four wax museums including a Louis Tussauds Wax Works, and themed restaurants including the Hard Rock Cafe and Rainforest Cafe.
 Marineland — Aquatic theme park
 Casinos — Casino Niagara and Niagara Fallsview Casino Resort
 IMAX Theatre and Daredevil museum
 Fallsview Tourist Area
 Fallsview Indoor Waterpark
 Tower Hotel (Niagara Falls)

Government
Niagara Falls City Council consists of eight councillors and a mayor. City elections take place every four years with the most recent election held on 24 October 2022. Council is responsible for policy and decision making, monitoring the operation and performance of the city, analysing and approving budgets and determining spending priorities. Due to regulations put forward by the Municipal Elections Act 1996, elections are held on the fourth Monday in October except for religious holidays or if a member of council or if the mayor resigns. Jim Diodati has been the mayor of Niagara Falls since 2010.

As of 2023, the city's fire and emergency services are staffed by 130 firefighters and 104 volunteers. Provincial roads (namely the Queen Elizabeth Way) are patrolled by the Ontario Provincial Police (OPP) and the rest by Niagara Regional Police (NRPS) for city streets and general policing or Niagara Parks Police (NPP) on property relating to Niagara Parks Commission. Policing on the Canadian side of bridges (Whirlpool and Rainbow Bridges) are conducted by both Canadian Border Services Agency (CBSA) and U.S. Customs and Border Protection (CBP) operations, but may involve Niagara Regional Police and/or OPP, as well as US agencies. Michigan Central Railway Bridge is an inactive railway bridge and closed off to prevent trespassing by the Canadian Pacific Railways and can be accessed by NRPS or CBSA/CBP if required.

Infrastructure

Transportation

Highways

Niagara Falls is linked to major highways in Canada. The Queen Elizabeth Way (QEW), stretching from Fort Erie to Toronto, passes through Niagara Falls. Highway 420 (along with Niagara Regional Road 420) connect the Rainbow Bridge to the QEW. The Niagara Parkway is a road operated under the Niagara Parks Commission which connects Niagara-on-the-Lake to Fort Erie via Niagara Falls.

Niagara Falls formerly had King's Highways passing through the city. These included:
 The original routing of Highway 3, (which later became Highway 3A), which ended at the Whirlpool Rapids Bridge via River Road
 Highway 8, which ended at the Whirlpool Rapids Bridge via Bridge Street
 Highway 20, which ended at the Honeymoon Bridge and later the Rainbow Bridge via Lundy's Lane and Clifton Hill

Rail

Via Rail Canada and Amtrak jointly provide service to the Niagara Falls station via their Maple Leaf service between Toronto Union Station and New York Penn Station.
 
In summer 2009, Go Transit started a pilot project providing weekend and holiday train service from Toronto to Niagara falls from mid June to mid October. These GO Trains run seasonally between Toronto Union Station and Niagara Falls at weekends.

At other times, regular hourly GO train services are provided between Toronto Union and Burlington station, where connecting bus services operate to and from the rail station at Niagara.

As of January 2019, GO Transit offers two-way, weekday commuter service from Niagara Falls station (Ontario) to Union Station (Toronto) as part of the Niagara GO Expansion. The full expansion project is expected to be complete by 2025.

Bus
Coach Canada has daily runs to and from Toronto and Buffalo, New York.
GO Transit offers daily bus service between Niagara and Burlington GO Station.
Megabus has daily runs on its route to New York City starting in Toronto.
Niagara Falls Transit is the public transit operator in the city.

Cabs and shuttle buses
Buffalo Airport Shuttle is a reservation based shuttle that operates from the Buffalo Airport to and from Niagara Falls, Buffalo, Hamilton, and Toronto.
Niagara Livery Service is a taxi/limo company in Niagara.
5-0 is a local cab service. A taxi shuttle provides transfers to airports from Buffalo, New York to Niagara Falls, Ontario and Toronto, Ontario.
Niagara Falls Taxi is a local taxi service from Buffalo, New York and Toronto, Ontario airports back to Niagara.
Elite Taxi is a local taxi service that provides regular and wheelchair accessible taxi service to and from Niagara Falls, ON. Specialists in airport transfers (Buffalo, Hamilton, Toronto, Niagara Falls, NY).

Active transportation
The City of Niagara Falls is working toward Bike Friendly designation and providing more resources to encourage active transportation.

Education
Niagara Falls has one post-secondary institution in the city and another in the Niagara Region. Niagara is served by the District School Board of Niagara and the Niagara Catholic District School Board which operate elementary and secondary schools in the region. There are also numerous private institutions offer alternatives to the traditional education systems.

Post secondary
In the Niagara Region: Brock University in St. Catharines.
In the City of Niagara Falls: Niagara College based in Welland, also has campuses in Niagara Falls, Niagara-on-the-Lake and St. Catharines.

High schools
A. N. Myer Secondary School
Westlane Secondary School
Stamford Collegiate
Saint Michael Catholic High School
Saint Paul Catholic High School

Library
Niagara Falls is also served by Niagara Falls Public Library, a growing library system composed of four branches, with the main branch in the downtown area. It is visited by over 10,000 people weekly. An extensive online database of photographs and artwork is maintained at Historic Niagara Digital Collections.

Media
Niagara Falls is served by two main local newspapers, three radio stations and a community television channel. All other media is regionally based, as well, from Hamilton and Toronto.

Newspapers
Local newspapers are:
Niagara Falls Review
Niagara This Week
St. Catharines Standard

Due to its proximity to Hamilton and Toronto, local residents have access to the papers like The Hamilton Spectator, the Toronto Star, and the Toronto Sun.

Radio
91.7 FM - CIXL-FM, "Giant FM" Classic Rock
97.7 FM – CHTZ-FM, "97.7 HTZ-FM" Mainstream Rock
101.1 FM – CFLZ-FM, "More FM" CHR
105.1 FM – CJED-FM, "105.1 The River FM" adult hits

The area is otherwise served by stations from Toronto, Hamilton and Buffalo.

Television
Cogeco is the local cable television franchise serving Niagara Falls; the system carries most major channels from Toronto and Buffalo, as well as TVCogeco, a community channel serving Niagara Falls.
CHCH-DT (UHF channel 15 - virtual channel 11) from Hamilton, Ontario also serves the Niagara Region.

Television stations from Toronto and Buffalo are also widely available. Officially, Niagara Falls is part of the Toronto television market, even though it is directly across the Niagara River from its American twin city, which is part of the Buffalo market.

Notable people

 Bruno Agostinelli, professional tennis player
 Ray Barkwill, Canadian national rugby player
 Harold Bradley, classical pianist
 Cathy Marie Buchanan, author
 James Cameron, film director
 Bill Cupolo, NHL player
 Kevin Dallman, NHL player
 Marty Dallman, NHL player
 Frank Dancevic, professional tennis player
 Sandro DeAngelis, CFL kicker
 Robert Nathaniel Dett, composer born in Drummondville
 Barbara Frum, CBC broadcaster
 William Giauque, recipient of 1949 Nobel Prize in Chemistry
 Mike Glumac, professional hockey player
 Brian Greenspan, lawyer
 Eddie Greenspan, lawyer
 Bobby Gunn, boxer
 Obs Heximer, NHL player
 Tim Hicks, country singer
 Honeymoon Suite, rock band
 Harold Howard, retired mixed martial artist and UFC fighter
 Jon Klassen, illustrator and children's book author
 Johnathan Kovacevic, NHL player
 Judy LaMarsh, second female federal cabinet minister in Canadian history
 Steve Ludzik, NHL player
 Denise Matthews, evangelist, singer
 Bob Manno, NHL player
 Nenad Medic, poker player
 Stephan Moccio, musician, arranger, composer
 Tom Moore, trade unionist
 Rick Morocco, ice hockey executive and professional player
 Johnny Mowers, NHL goalie
 Rob Nicholson, former Minister of Justice and Attorney General for Canada
 Terry O'Reilly, NHL player and head coach
 Roula Partheniou, contemporary artist
 Frank Pietrangelo, NHL goalie
 Burr Plato, politician
 deadmau5, musician and DJ
 Isabelle Rezazadeh, DJ and record producer
 Phil Roberto, NHL player
 Derek Sanderson, NHL player
 Jarrod Skalde, NHL player
 Russell Teibert, soccer player 
 Jay Triano, former NBA head coach
 Gillian Robertson, UFC Fighter
 Tvangeste, symphonic black metal band formerly based on Kaliningrad, Russia
 Wave, pop band
 Sherman Zavitz, historian
 Murda Beatz, Producer and DJ
 Steve Terreberry, musician, comedian, and YouTuber
 Mary Ellen Turpel-Lafond, lawyer and professor; former judge
 Greg Kovacs, bodybuilder

See also  
 List of tallest buildings in Niagara Falls, Ontario
 List of people who have gone over Niagara Falls

References

Further reading
 Mah, Alice. Industrial Ruination, Community, and Place: Landscapes and Legacies of Urban Decline (University of Toronto Press; 2012) 240 pages; comparative study of urban and industrial decline in Niagara Falls (Canada and the United States), Newcastle upon Tyne, Britain, and Ivanovo, Russia.

External links

 
Cities in Ontario
Lower-tier municipalities in Ontario